The Nelson Mail is a 4-day a week newspaper in Nelson, New Zealand owned by media business Stuff Ltd. It was founded in 1866 as The Nelson Evening Mail; the first edition was published on 5 March 1866. It absorbed another local paper, The Colonist, in about 1906.

Awards and nominations 
In 2018, The Nelson Mail reporter Nina Hindmarsh won Best Junior Reporter at the 2018 Voyager Media Awards.

In 2019, The Nelson Mail photographer Braden Fastier was the joint winner of Photographer of the Year at the 2019 Voyager Media Awards. Fastier also won the Best Photography (News and/or Sport) Award at the same event.Also in 2019, Fastier won the News Photography (Regional) Award and the News Photography (Sports) Award from News Media Works.

References

External links

 Official website

Stuff (company)
Newspapers published in New Zealand
Publications established in 1866
Mass media in Nelson, New Zealand
1866 establishments in New Zealand